The 1958 United States Senate special election in West Virginia was held on November 4, 1958, concurrent with a regular election. The election was called due to the death of Senator Matthew M. Neely.

Democrats Randolph and Byrd both won their seats, amid a national wave election. This would be the last time that Democrats simultaneously flipped both of a state's Senate seats until Georgia's elections in 2020 and 2021.

Democratic primary

Candidates 
 Jennings Randolph of Elkins, member of the U.S. House for the 2nd district, 1933 - 1947.
 William C. Marland of Charleston, Governor, 1953 - 1957.
 Arnold Vickers of Montgomery, W.V. Senate President, 1945 - 1949.
 W.R. "Squibb" Wilson of Fairmont, member of the W.V. House for Marion County, 1957 - 1958.

Campaign
While campaigning with Robert C. Byrd, Randolph was involved in a car accident, veering into oncoming traffic and killing another driver. According to the testimony of Byrd, Randolph fell asleep at the wheel and woke up shortly before hitting the other driver. Wetzel County prosecutor Jack Hawkins declined to file charges, and Byrd's insurance company settled with the victim's widow out of court, being forced to pay the full sum of Byrd's liability, $22,500.

Results

Republican primary

Candidates
 John D. Hoblitzell, Jr. of Ravenswood, interim U.S. Senator, 1958 - 1958.

Results

General election

References 

West Virginia 1958
West Virginia 1958
1958 Special
West Virginia Special
United States Senate Special
United States Senate 1958